The 4th Infantry Division was a regular infantry division of the British Army with a very long history, seeing active service in the Peninsular War, the Crimean War, the First World War, and during the Second World War. It was disbanded after the war and reformed in the 1950s as an armoured formation before being disbanded and reformed again and finally disbanded on 1 January 2012.

Napoleonic Wars
The 4th Division was originally formed in 1809 by Arthur Wellesley, 1st Duke of Wellington, as part of the Anglo-Portuguese Army, for service in the Peninsular War. It fought in the Battles of Talavera, Salamanca, Roncesvalles, Vitoria, the Pyrenees, Orthez, and Toulouse, and the siege of Badajoz.

Peninsular War order of battle
The order of battle from January 1812 was as follows:

Major General Sir Charles Colville (to April 1812)
Major General Lowry Cole (from June 1812)
 1st Brigade: Major General James Kemmis
 3/27th (Inniskilling) Regiment of Foot
 1/40th (2nd Somersetshire) Regiment of Foot
 1/48th (Northamptonshire) Regiment of Foot (from October 1812)
 2nd Provisional Battalion (2nd & 1/53rd Regiments of Foot) (from December 1812)
 1 Coy., 5/60th (Royal American) Regiment of Foot
 2nd Brigade: Major General Sir Edward Pakenham
 1/7th Regiment of Foot (Royal Fusiliers)
 2/7th Regiment of Foot (Royal Fusiliers) (November 1810 to May 1811)
 20th (East Devonshire) Regiment of Foot (from November 1812)
 1/23rd Regiment of Foot (Royal Welsh Fusiliers)
 1/48th (Northamptonshire) Regiment of Foot (to October 1812)
 1/82nd Regiment of Foot (Prince of Wales's Volunteers) (October to November 1812)
 1 Coy., Brunswick-Oels Jaegers
 3rd Brigade: Major General Skerrett (October to December 1812)
 3/1st Foot Guards
 2/47th (Lancashire) Regiment of Foot
 2/87th (Prince of Wales's Irish) Regiment of Foot
 2 Cos., 2/95th Regiment of Foot (Rifles)
 Portuguese Brigade: Major General Collins
 1/11th Line Infantry of the Portuguese Army
 2/11th Line Infantry of the Portuguese Army
 1/23rd Line Infantry of the Portuguese Army
 2/23rd Line Infantry of the Portuguese Army
 7th Caçadores of the Portuguese Army

Waterloo
At the Battle of Waterloo it was tasked with holding Wellington's right flank and, with the exception of its 4th brigade, took no active part in the fighting, but did capture the town of Cambrai afterwards. The commanding general at this time was Charles Colville. In his novel Les Misérables Victor Hugo credits Colville with asking for the surrender of the Imperial Guard at Waterloo and receiving General Cambronne's reply of "Merde".

Waterloo order of battle
 Commanding General Major-General Sir Charles Colville
 4th Brigade – Lieutenant-Colonel Hugh Henry Mitchell
 3/14th (Buckinghamshire) Regiment of Foot
 1/23rd Regiment of Foot (Royal Welch Fusiliers)
 51st (2nd Yorkshire West Riding) Regiment of Foot (Light Infantry)
 6th Brigade – Major-General George Johnstone
 2/35th (Sussex) Regiment of Foot
 54th (West Norfolk) Regiment of Foot
 59th (2nd Nottinghamshire) Regiment of Foot
 1/91st (Argyllshire) Regiment of Foot
 6th Hanoverian Brigade – Major-General Sir James Lyon
 Field Battalion Calenberg
 Field Battalion Lauenburg
 Landwehr Battalion Bentheim
 Landwehr Battalion Hoya
 Landwehr Battalion Nienburg

Crimean War
The Division was also called for service during the Crimean War fought between the allied forces of the United Kingdom, French Empire and the Ottoman Empire on one side and Russia on the other. It saw action in the Battle of Alma the Battle of Inkerman and the Battle of Balaclava, fought on 25 October 1854 (famous for the Charge of the Light Brigade and the Thin Red Line).

Crimean War order of battle
Commanding General: Major General Sir George Cathcart
 7th Brigade: Brigadier General Torrens
 20th (East Devonshire) Regiment of Foot
 21st Royal Scots Fusiliers
 68th (Durham) Regiment of Foot (Light Infantry)
 8th Brigade
 46th (South Devonshire) Regiment of Foot
 57th (West Middlesex) Regiment of Foot
 one field battery royal Artillery

First World War

As a permanently established Regular Army division it was amongst the first to be sent to France as part of the British Expeditionary Force at the outbreak of the First World War. It served on the Western Front for the duration of the war and was present during all the major offensives including the Battle of the Marne, Battle of Ypres, Battle of the Somme and the Battle of Passchendaele.

Order of battle
The order of battle of 4th Division during the First World War was as follows:
 10th Brigade 
 1st Battalion, Royal Warwickshire Regiment
 2nd Battalion, Seaforth Highlanders
 1st Battalion, Royal Irish Fusiliers (left August 1917)
 2nd Battalion, Royal Dublin Fusiliers (left November 1916)
 10th Machine Gun Company, Machine Gun Corps (formed 22 December 1915, moved to 4th Battalion, Machine Gun Corps 26 February 1918)
 10th Trench Mortar Battery (formed June 1916)
 1/7th Battalion, Argyll and Sutherland Highlanders (from January 1915 until March 1916)
 1/9th Battalion, Argyll and Sutherland Highlanders (from May to July 1915)
 Household Battalion (from November 1916 until February 1918)
 3/10th Battalion, Middlesex Regiment (from August 1917 until February 1918)
 2nd Battalion, Duke of Wellington's (West Riding Regiment) (from February 1918)

 11th Brigade 
 1st Battalion, Somerset Light Infantry
 1st Battalion, East Lancashire Regiment (left February 1918)
 1st Battalion, Hampshire Regiment
 1st Battalion, Rifle Brigade (Prince Consort's Own)
 1/5th (City of London) Battalion, London Regiment (London Rifle Brigade) (from November 1914 until May 1915)
 2nd Battalion, Royal Irish Regiment (from July 1915 until May 1916)
 11th Battalion, Machine Gun Corps (formed 23 December 1915, moved to 4th Battalion, Machine Gun Corps 26 February 1918)
 11th Trench Mortar Battery (formed June 1916)

 12th Brigade 
 1st Battalion, King's Own Royal Regiment (Lancaster)
 2nd Battalion, Lancashire Fusiliers
 2nd Battalion, Royal Inniskilling Fusiliers (left December 1914)
 2nd Battalion, Essex Regiment
 1/2nd Battalion, Monmouthshire Regiment (until January 1916)
 1/5th Battalion, South Lancashire Regiment (from February 1915 until January 1916)
 12th Machine Gun Company, Machine Gun Corps (formed 24 January 1916, moved to 4th Battalion, Machine Gun Corps 26 February 1918)
 12th Trench Mortar Battery (formed 11 June 1916)
 2nd Battalion, Duke of Wellington's (West Riding Regiment) (from January 1916 to 10th Bde. February 1918)
 2nd Battalion, Royal Irish Regiment (from March until July 1915)

From early November 1915 until February 1916 the 12th Brigade was swapped with the 107th Brigade of the 36th (Ulster) Division.

Artillery
 XIV Brigade, Royal Field Artillery (until 14 January 1917)
 XXIX Brigade, Royal Field Artillery
 XXXII Brigade, Royal Field Artillery
 XXXVII (Howitzer) Brigade, Royal Field Artillery (until 17 February 1915)
 CXXVII (Howitzer) Brigade, Royal Field Artillery (from 6 August 1915 until 21 May 1916)
 31st Heavy Battery, Royal Garrison Artillery (until 29 April 1915)

Engineers
 7th Field Company, Royal Engineers (until 29 April 1915)
 9th Field Company, Royal Engineers
 1st West Lancashire Field Company, Royal Engineers (from 14 February 1915 until 28 February 1916)
 1st Renfrew Field Company, Royal Engineers (joined 2 May 1916; became 406th (Renfrew) Field Company 3 February 1917)
 1st Durham Field Company, Royal Engineers (joined 20 September 1916; became 526th (Durham) Field Company 3 February 1917)

Pioneers
 21st (Service) Battalion, West Yorkshire Regiment (from 21 June 1916)

Second World War

France and Belgium

Shortly after the outbreak of the Second World War in September 1939 the 4th Division, under Major General Dudley Johnson, who had won the Victoria Cross (VC) in the Great War, was sent to the border between France and Belgium as part of Lieutenant-General Alan Brooke's II Corps of the British Expeditionary Force (BEF). All three of the division's brigades were commanded by distinguished soldiers, the 10th by Brigadier Evelyn Barker, the 11th by Brigadier Kenneth Anderson and the 12th by Brigadier John Hawkesworth. After the disastrous Battle of France in May–June 1940, where the division sustained heavy losses, and the evacuation at Dunkirk, it spent the next two years in the United Kingdom on anti-invasion duties and training for its next deployment.

In June 1942 the division, now under Major General John Hawkesworth, was selected to be converted into a 'mixed' division, consisting of two infantry brigades and one tank brigade. As a result of this change, the divisions' 11th Infantry Brigade left the division and was replaced by the 21st Army Tank Brigade.

North Africa

The division departed for North Africa in early 1943, arriving in Tunisia in March, coming under Lieutenant-General John Crocker's IX Corps, part of the British First Army. During the Tunisian Campaign it was involved in Operation Vulcan, the final ground attack against Axis forces in North Africa which ended the North African Campaign, with the surrender of nearly 250,000 German and Italian soldiers. During the assault the division suffered heavy losses, with four battalions sustaining over 300 casualties. After the Axis defeat in North Africa, in May 1943, the division was to remain there for the next 9 months, during which time it was converted back into a standard infantry division, with the 28th Infantry Brigade, consisting mainly of Regular Army battalions who had served on garrison duties in Gibraltar, arriving to replace the 21st Tank Brigade.

Italy
The division arrived on the Italian Front in late February 1944, relieving the British 46th Infantry Division, initially coming under command of Lieutenant-General Richard McCreery's British X Corps, then serving under the U.S. Fifth Army. In March the division transferred to Lieutenant-General Sidney Kirkman's British XIII Corps, part of the British Eighth Army. The division, now under the command of Major-General Alfred Dudley Ward, fought with distinction at the fourth and final Battle of Monte Cassino in May 1944, and later in severe fighting in the battles for the Gothic Line. During the battle of Cassino Captain Richard Wakeford of the 2/4th Battalion, Hampshire Regiment was awarded the Victoria Cross.

Greece
However, in November 1944 it was dispatched, with the rest of III Corps, to Greece to provide assistance during the Greek Civil War, and was to remain there until the end of the war in Europe in May 1945.

Order of battle
The 4th Infantry Division was constituted as follows during the war

10th Infantry Brigade
 2nd Battalion, Bedfordshire and Hertfordshire Regiment
 2nd Battalion, Duke of Cornwall's Light Infantry
 1st Battalion, Queen's Own Royal West Kent Regiment (left 3 May 1940)
 10th Infantry Brigade Anti-Tank Company (disbanded 1 January 1941)
 1/6th Battalion, East Surrey Regiment (from 4 May 1940)

11th Infantry Brigade (left 5 June 1942)
 2nd Battalion, Lancashire Fusiliers
 1st Battalion, East Surrey Regiment
 1st Battalion, Oxfordshire and Buckinghamshire Light Infantry (left 29 January 1940)
 11th Infantry Brigade Anti-Tank Company (disbanded 31 December 1940)
 5th (Huntingdonshire) Battalion, Northamptonshire Regiment (from 29 January 1940)

12th Infantry Brigade
 2nd Battalion, Royal Fusiliers
 1st Battalion, South Lancashire Regiment (left 13 June 1940)
 1st Battalion, Black Watch (Royal Highland Regiment) (left 4 March 1940)
 12th Infantry Brigade Anti-Tank Company (disbanded 3 January 1941)
 6th Battalion, Black Watch (Royal Highland Regiment) (from 4 March 1940)
 1st Battalion, Queen's Own Royal West Kent Regiment (from 5 September 1940)

21st Army Tank Brigade (from 6 June 1942, left 12 December 1943)
 12th Royal Tank Regiment
 48th Royal Tank Regiment
 145th Regiment Royal Armoured Corps

28th Infantry Brigade (from 24 December 1943)
 2nd Battalion, King's Regiment (Liverpool)
 2nd Battalion, Somerset Light Infantry
 1st Battalion, Argyll and Sutherland Highlanders (from 5 January, left 2 February 1944)
 2/4th Battalion, Hampshire Regiment (from 24 March 1943)

Divisional Troops
 5th Dragoon Guards (Reconnaissance Battalion, left 31 March 1940)
 4th Battalion, Reconnaissance Corps (from 1 January 1941, redesignated 4th Regiment 6 June 1942, became 4th Reconnaissance Regiment, Royal Armoured Corps 1 January 1944)
 2nd Battalion, Royal Northumberland Fusiliers (joined as Machine Gun Battalion from 11 November 1941, left 20 May 1942, rejoined as Support Battalion 10 March 1944, became MG Battalion from 7 June 1944)
 17th Field Regiment, Royal Artillery (left 19 February 1940)
 22nd Field Regiment, Royal Artillery
 30th Field Regiment, Royal Artillery
 77th (Highland) Field Regiment, Royal Artillery (from 19 February 1940)
 14th Anti-Tank Regiment, Royal Artillery
 91st Light Anti-Aircraft Regiment, Royal Artillery (from 26 January 1942, disbanded 6 November 1944)
 7th Field Company, Royal Engineers
 9th Field Company, Royal Engineers (left 16 February 1940)
 59th Field Company, Royal Engineers
 225th Field Company, Royal Engineers (from 16 February 1940)
 18th Field Park Company, Royal Engineers
 3rd Bridging Platoon, Royal Engineers (from 18 October 1943)
 4th Divisional Signals, Royal Corps of Signals

Post Second World War
The Division was reformed from 11th Armoured Division on 1 April 1956, and took on 20th Armoured Brigade Group from the disbanding 6th Armoured Division in May 1958. At the time the Division also incorporated the (Canadian) 4th Infantry Brigade and the 4th Guards Brigade.

During the 1970s, the division consisted of two "square" brigades, the 11th Armoured Brigade and the 20th Armoured Brigade. It was renamed 4th Armoured Division and served with I (BR) Corps being based at Hammersmith Barracks in Herford from 1978. After being briefly reorganised into two "task forces" ("Golf" and "Hotel") in the late 1970s, the division consisted of the 11th Armoured, the 20th Armoured, and the 33rd Armoured Brigades in the 1980s.

The division ceased its role as a frontline Armoured Division on 1 July 1993.

1995–2012

The 4th Division was reformed as an administrative division – effectively a military district – from South East District and Eastern District on 1 April 1995. It had its permanent headquarters at the Military Headquarters Building in Steeles Road, Aldershot.

The Division was responsible for the administration of Aldershot Garrison, British Gurkhas Nepal and British Garrison Brunei and by 2000 comprised the following Regional Brigades:
 2nd (South East) Brigade
 49th (East) Brigade
 145th (South) Brigade
 16 Air Assault Brigade

Following further reshuffling, 49th (East) Brigade came under the command of the 5th Division based in Shrewsbury from 1 April 2007, 43 (Wessex) Brigade was transferred to 4th Division on 1 April 2007 and 16 Air Assault Brigade became subordinated to Joint Helicopter Command.

The Division reported to Army Headquarters at Andover from 2010. The new HQ Support Command in Aldershot began operation in January 2012 when HQ 4th Division in Aldershot disbanded. HQ 2nd division in Edinburgh and HQ 5th division in Shrewsbury were both disbanded in April 2012.

See also

 List of commanders of the British 4th Division
 List of British divisions in World War I
 List of British divisions in World War II
 British Army Order of Battle (September 1939)

Notes

References
 Becke, Major A.F. (1934) History of the Great War: Order of Battle of Divisions, Part 1: The Regular British Divisions, London: HM Stationery Office, 1934/Uckfield: Naval & Military Press, 2007, .
 Chappel M. (1986) British Battle Insignia (1). 1914–18 Osprey Publishing 
 
 
 Litchfield, Norman E.H. (1992) The Territorial Artillery 1908–1988 (Their Lineage, Uniforms and Badges), Nottingham: Sherwood Press, .
 Pemberton, W. Baring (1962). Battles of the Crimean War. Pan Books Ltd.

External links
 The British Army in the Great War: The 4th Division
 British Military History: 4 Division (1930-38)
 4 Infantry Division (1944–45)
 British Unit Histories
 The Royal Artillery 1939–45
 Orbat.com

1809 establishments in the United Kingdom
Infantry divisions of the British Army in World War I
Infantry divisions of the British Army in World War II
Military units and formations established in 1809
British military units and formations of the Crimean War